Purgation may refer to:
 Inducing bowel movement with a laxative
 The purification of the soul
 In this life, see State (theology)
 In Purgatory
 Purgation (album), Trigger the Bloodshed album
 In US patent law, purgation of misuse refers to discontinuance of a restrictive practice and dissipation of its adverse results – see B.B. Chemical Co. v. Ellis